Jam (or may called Ja'am) is a native title of rulers of a few princely states, notably born in western British India by the Samaa dynasty and their Jadeja branch.

Jam:
 The leaders of the Islam-converted Samaa dynasty Rajputs of the Greater Sindh Sultanate

Jam Sahib :
 The rulers of Nawanagar State, a Salute state, since its 1535 foundation, until their promotion to Maharaja Jam Sahib in 1895
 The rulers of Las Bela State in Pakistan, descended from the Samma dynasty

Notable Jams 
Jam Tamachi (Jam Khairuddin) (1367–1379 AD) or Jam Khairuddin bin Jam Unad, a famous sultan of the Samma dynasty
Jam Nizamuddin II (866–914 AH, 1461–1508 AD), the most famous sultan of the Samma dynasty
Jam Rawal or Jam Shri Rawalji Lakhoji Jadeja (1480-1562), Jadeja Rajput ruler of Kutch State (1524-1548) and founder-ruler of Nawanagar State (1540-1562)
Jam Ferozudin (1508–1527) or Jam Feruz bin Jam Nizam, last ruler of the Samma dynasty 926 AH (1519 AD)
Jam Bhamboo Khan Dahar (1820-1870) chief sardar of Dahars governor of south Sindh Sukkur to Multan
Jam Muneeer Ahmed Dahar Former Politician And Chief Sardar 
Jam Sadiq Ali (1899-1992), former Chief Minister of Sindh
Jam Ghulam Qadir Khan Korejo (1920-1988), former Chief Minister of Balochistan, Pakistan and Jam of Lasbela
Jam Muhammad Hassnain Dahar : The Notable

Cities named after Jams
 Jam Nawaz Ali
 Jam Shoro
 Tando Jam
 Jampur
 Torbat-e Jam, Iran
 Jamnagar, Gujarat, India

External links 
 WorldStatesman - India - Princely States K-Z
 WorldStatesman - Pakistan - Princey States

Heads of state
Noble titles
Titles in India
Indian surnames
Hindu surnames
Titles in Pakistan
Titles of national or ethnic leadership
Royal titles
Jamote people
Samma tribes